David Cohen is an Israeli diplomat.

Biography
David Cohen was the first resident Israeli Ambassador to Albania.  At the end of his tenure as Ambassador to Chile in 2009, he was appointed non-resident Ambassador to Albania, Bosnia-Herzegovina and Macedonia.

Cohen also served as Ambassador to El Salvador concurrently serving in Belize and to Bulgaria.

See also
Foreign relations of Israel

References

Ambassadors of Israel to Albania
Ambassadors of Israel to Chile
Ambassadors of Israel to Bosnia and Herzegovina
Ambassadors of Israel to El Salvador
Ambassadors of Israel to Belize
Ambassadors of Israel to Bulgaria
Living people
Year of birth missing (living people)